The 2017 FINA Diving World Series, also known as FINA/NVC Diving World Series is the ninth edition of  FINA Diving World Series. The 1st leg is Beijing, China and followed by, 2nd leg Guangzhou, China. The 3rd leg is in Kazan, Russia and the final leg in Windsor, Canada. A total of 68 divers (31 men and 37 women) competed.

Overall medal tally

Beijing leg 
The first leg took place between 3 and 5 March 2017.

Medal table

Medal summary

Men

Women

Mixed

Guangzhou leg 
The second leg took place between 9 and 11 March 2017.

Medal table

Medal summary

Men

Women

Mixed

Kazan leg 
The third leg took place between 31 March and 2 April 2017.

Medal table

Medal summary

Men

Women

Mixed

Windsor leg 
The final leg took place between 21 and 23 April 2017.

Medal summary

Men

Women

Mixed

References

FINA Diving World Series
2017 in diving